The Boston and Maine Railroad Talgo Train consisted of five, three-segment articulated passenger cars and was powered by two Fairbanks-Morse P-12-42 engines at either end. It was called the "Talgo Train" by B&M employees. The builder called the locomotives "Speed Merchants", but the B&M never used this moniker in its advertising. After making a single round-trip to Portland, Maine, during which it ignited a trackside fire, the train served in commuter service on the railroad's Eastern and Western routes until 1965. Two separate fires in 1963 and 1965 caused two of the three articulated cars to be removed from service, after which it sat idle in the yard adjacent to the Boston Engine Terminal (aka the Engine House) in Charlestown, Massachusetts. In its last year of service, the trainset was renowned for constant breakdowns, consequently spending an inordinate amount of time in the shops. Thus, the decision was made to remove it from active service. Eventually, eight segments of the passenger cars were sold to a private restaurateur in Chelsea, Massachusetts, who incorporated three segments into his restaurant and stored the remaining five on the property. The two locomotives were sold to National Metal Converters of Leeds, Maine, for use as power sources. They were eventually scrapped.

See also 
 John Quincy Adams train
 Speed Merchant train

References

Boston and Maine Railroad
Fairbanks-Morse